Conceptual character or ‘conceptual personae’ is a philosophical term in Continental philosophy, and notably associated with the French philosophers Gilles Deleuze and Félix Guattari. The term denotes fictional, or semi-fictional, characters created by one or more authors to convey one or more ideas. Even if originally a historical individual may have existed, this individual was later instrumentalized by the authors. Michel Onfray, in his Contre histoire de la philosophie ("Counter-history of philosophy"), regularly used this concept like most history of philosophy when explaining Plato's Symposium. Since Socrates never wrote, plato use his master in this book and put his word in his mouth. When you read it, you need to keep in mind you reed Plato, not Socrates.

Examples 
 The Zarathustra, Dionysus and the Antichrist of Nietzsche
 Plato's Socrates
 Kierkegaard's Don Juan
 Edmond Rostand's Cyrano de Bergerac

See also 
 Historical figure

Gilles Deleuze
Concepts in the philosophy of history